Walter Wilkinson (1888–1970) was a puppeteer, writer and artist. According to a plaque erected in the garden of a house in the village of Selworthy, Somerset, he was born in 1888, began his wandering from this location and died in 1970.  It is inferred in his fourth book that he fought in the First World War on the Western Front:  "Strange to think that only a few weeks ago she was charming young men in Vienna, men at whom, a few years ago, the showmen might have been pointing a rifle".

Works 

He became interested in puppets while in Italy before the First World War, and tried to revive the anachronistic Punch and Judy show back in England.  He created his own characters, carving the heads from wood, claiming that the traditional Punch and Judy was enough to scare children away. His hand puppets included Barleycorn, Uncle Joe, Old Martha, Pretty Sally, Cheeky Pipi, the Rev. Mr Black and the Monkey.  He referred to his hand puppet theatre as 'The Peep-Show', also the title of his first book describing his travels with these creations.

He first performed with his brother, Arthur Wilkinson, travelling the country in a caravan.  Arthur later set up The Marionette Society, while Walter persevered with hand puppets.

Walter Wilkinson wrote and had published a series of eight books about his travels with his puppet show in England, Scotland, Wales and America.  He built a barrow which converted into the theatre which he would erect on village greens, in schools or wherever he could find an audience. He carried his tent on his barrow and spent the summers camping in the countryside. He was a popular author in the 1930s and 1940s, receiving positive reviews from D. H. Lawrence, J. B. Priestley and other contemporary critics.  He illustrated the end papers and dust jackets of his books himself with annotated maps; his last published book "Puppets in Wales" also contains some of his drawings within the text of the manuscript.  In the later books he is accompanied by his wife, Winifred.  They travelled to America in 1937 where they were guests of honour at the Puppet Festival.  The following year he also travelled to Canada.

Personal Philosophy 

His personal philosophy is intrinsically outlined in all his books and set out in his first book: "If I were a philosopher expounding a new theory of living, inventing a new "ism," I should call myself a holidayist, for it seems to me that the one thing the world needs to put it right is a holiday.  There is no doubt whatever about the sort of life nice people want to lead.  Whenever they get the chance, what do they do but go away to the country or the seaside, take off their collars and ties and have a good time playing at childish games and contriving to eat some simple food very happily without all the encumbrances of chairs and tables.  This world might be quite a nice place if only simple people would be content to be simple and be proud of it; if only they would turn their backs on these pompous politicians and ridiculous Captains of Industry who, when you come to examine them, turn out to be very stupid, ignorant people, who are simply suffering from an unhappy mania of greediness; who are possessed with perverse and horrible devils which make them stick up smoky factories in glorious Alpine valleys, or spoil some simple country by digging up and exploiting its decently buried mineral resources; or whose moral philosophy is so patently upside down when they attempt to persuade us that quarrelling, and fighting, and wars, or that these ridiculous accumulations of wealth are the most important, instead of the most undesirable things in life. If only simple people would ignore them and behave always in the jolly way they do on a seashore what a nice world we might have to live in.
Luckily nature has a way with her, and we may rest assured that this wretched machine age will all be over in a few years' time.  It has grown up as a mushroom, and like a mushroom it has no stability.  It will die."

In Puppets in Wales he describes his personal views as a pagan, believing that people should live simpler lives and be in touch with the earth, advocating a religious rite of growing potatoes.  He views industrialization as a negative force, disparaging the emergence of automobiles, airplanes, and factory production.

Later life 

It appears he spent the war years (1939–1945) in America with Winifred.  A contemporary newspaper indicates that he performed at Vassar College, New York, in January 1940.  The flyleaf to his final published book states that "During the war the puppets remained in their box, but in the summer of 1947 Mr. Wilkinson took them out again for a journey through Wales..."  At this time he describes himself as living in Putney.

He travelled to Australia in early 1954, spending six months in the country, and drafted Puppets Through Australia, but this book has never been published.  It is rumoured to lie in a tea chest in a house in Braunton, Devon, some 40 km from Selworthy, along with other drafts and photographs.

Little is known of his final years.

His puppets are on display at the Pitt Rivers Museum, Oxford, and were at the Victoria and Albert Museum (not currently on display).

Bibliography 

 The Peep-Show – Geoffrey Bles, London (1927)
 Vagabonds and Puppets – Geoffrey Bles, London (1930)
 Puppets in Yorkshire – Geoffrey Bles, London (1931)
 A Sussex Peep-Show – Geoffrey Bles, London (1933)
 Puppets into Scotland – Geoffrey Bles, London (1935)
 Puppets Through Lancashire – Geoffrey Bles, London (1936)
 Puppets Through America – Geoffrey Bles, London (1938)
 Puppets in Wales – Geoffrey Bles, London (1948)

References 

1888 births
1970 deaths
British puppeteers
20th-century British writers
British artists